The 1974 Copa Fraternidad was the fourth Central American club championship played between 6 clubs.  C.S.D. Municipal won the tournament.

Teams

Results

Standings

Champion

References

External links
RSSSF - Copa Fraternidad

1974
1
1973–74 in Costa Rican football
1973–74 in Salvadoran football
1973–74 in Guatemalan football